Toomer is a surname. Notable people with the surname include:

 Barbara Toomer (1929–2018), American advocate for disability rights
 Amani Toomer, football player formerly with the New York Giants
 Fred A. Toomer, Third Vice-President and member of the Board of Directors of Atlanta Life Insurance Company
 Gerald J. Toomer, historian of astronomy and mathematics
 Jean Toomer, American poet of the Harlem Renaissance
 Ron Toomer, roller coaster designer
 Walter Toomer (1883–1962), English footballer

See also
 Toomer, an abbreviation for Fred A. Toomer Elementary School in Atlanta, Georgia